The Northern Eagles were a rugby league team that competed in the National Rugby League (NRL) between 2000 and 2002. The club was formed during the rationalisation process of the NRL by the merger of the Manly Warringah Sea Eagles and the North Sydney Bears in 2000. The team shared home games between Brookvale Oval and Central Coast Stadium, Gosford, New South Wales.

Little success was had during three seasons (2000-2002), finishing 12th, 10th, and 9th, winning 30 of 76 games. Also, the new club's decision to play games in Gosford instead of the Bears home ground at North Sydney Oval alienated several North Sydney fans, despite North Sydney's planned move to the new Central Coast Stadium, which had been rebuilt for the Bears on the site of the old Grahame Park ground. In spite of this, the club provided more players for the 2001 State of Origin series' New South Wales team than any other club. The partnership folded in 2002, with Manly emerging as the stand-alone entity. The 2002 season was played under the Northern Eagles name, although effectively the club was the Manly Warringah Sea Eagles by another name.  Halfway through the season, the Eagles even abandoned playing games at Gosford, due to a sharp decline in attendances.  The people of Gosford preferred to wait until a home-grown team was based there. The Manly Warringah Sea Eagles name and colours returned to the NRL in 2003.

North Sydney now field a team in the Canterbury Cup NSW, the competition immediately below NRL level, as a feeder to the Sydney Roosters. There are plans to again be part of the NRL in coming years as the Central Coast Bears.

Home grounds
The Northern Eagles shared their home games between Brookvale Oval in Sydney and Grahame Park in Gosford. The record attendance for the club was 20,059 for the club's opening game against the Newcastle Knights at Grahame Park on 6 February 2000. The record attendance for the club at Brookvale Oval was 14,521 against Cronulla on 21 July 2002.

Emblem and colours

Primary jerseys

Players

A total of sixty nine players played for the club. Steve Menzies played the most games for the club, with 69 caps.

State of Origin

New South Wales
    Geoff Toovey (2000)
    Adam Muir (2000–01)
    Steve Menzies (2001–02)
    Brett Kimmorley (2001)

City Vs Country origin

NSW City
    Steve Menzies (2001)

NSW Country
    Brett Kimmorley (2001)

Records

Club records
Biggest win
 28 points, 30–2 against Cronulla-Sutherland Sharks at Brookvale Oval on 18 March 2000

Biggest loss
 58 points, 10–68 against New Zealand Warriors at Ericsson Stadium on 14 April 2002

Most consecutive wins
 2 matches, 21–26 February 2000
 2 matches, 23–29 April 2000
 2 matches, 25 June - 2 July 2000
 2 matches, 22–28 April 2001
 2 matches, 23–29 June 2002
 2 matches, 4–11 August 2002

Most consecutive losses
 4 matches, 25 March - 15 April 2000
 4 matches, 9–30 July 2000
 4 matches, 25 August 2001 – 30 March 2002

Most points in a season
 Ben Walker - 279 (18 tries, 103 goals, 1 field goal) in 2001

Record attendance
 20,059 vs Newcastle Knights at NorthPower Stadium, 6 February 2000
 14,521 vs Cronulla-Sutherland Sharks at Brookvale Oval, 21 July 2002

Post 2003
Since the Northern Eagles folded at the end of 2002, Manly and North Sydney have gone their separate ways.

Manly officially returned to the NRL in 2003 (playing out of Brookvale Oval, though they played at least two games per season in Gosford until 2015) and have since played in four NRL Grand Finals (2007, 2008, 2011 and 2013), winning the premiership in 2008 and 2011.

North Sydney began playing in the NSW Cup (formerly known as Reserve Grade) at their traditional base, North Sydney Oval, where they are the feeder team to the Sydney Roosters.  Before this, Norths were the feeder team for South Sydney from 2007 to 2018. As of 2014, there have been several attempts for the Bears to come back into the NRL by being based at the Central Coast, North Sydney, Perth, Gold Coast and Brisbane. Former North Sydney internationals Greg Florimo and David Fairleigh play a prominent role in the club's push to join the NRL. So far they have failed to gain a licence to re-enter the NRL with the latest push of buying the Manly Sea Eagles licence from Penn Sports for $6,000,000 after a failed attempt by Qatar to buy Manly for $22,000,000 a week earlier.

See also

Central Coast Bears

References

2000 establishments in Australia
2002 disestablishments in Australia
Defunct NSWRL/ARL/SL/NRL clubs
Defunct rugby league teams in Australia
Northern Eagles
Rugby clubs established in 2000
Rugby league teams in New South Wales
Sports clubs disestablished in 2002